Mount Conrad is a  mountain summit in British Columbia, Canada.

Description
Mount Conrad is located in The Bugaboos area, on the west side of Bugaboo Provincial Park. It is part of the Purcell Mountains which are a subset of the Columbia Mountains. Precipitation runoff from Mount Conrad drains northeast to the Columbia River via Vowell Creek, and southwest to Duncan River via Giegerich and East creeks.

History

The mountain's name honors Conrad Kain (1883–1934), an eminent mountain guide in British Columbia's Purcell Mountains. He is credited with more than 60 first ascents in the Rockies and Purcells, including first ascents of the 3 highest peaks of the Canadian Rockies; and Howser Spire and Bugaboo Spire in the Bugaboos. The mountain's toponym was published in "A Climber's Guide to the Interior Ranges of British Columbia" by J.M. Thorington in 1947, and it was officially adopted on November 15, 1962, by the Geographical Names Board of Canada.  

The first ascent of the summit was made in 1933 by Dr. and Mrs. I. A. Richards, guided by Conrad Kain. The mountain was named in 1935 by I. A. Richards.

Climate
Based on the Köppen climate classification, Mount Conrad is located in a subarctic climate zone with cold, snowy winters, and mild summers. Winter temperatures can drop below −20 °C with wind chill factors below −30 °C. This climate supports the Conrad Icefield covering the peak's northern slope.

See also

 The Bugaboos
 Geography of British Columbia

References

External links
 Mount Conrad: weather

Columbia Valley
Three-thousanders of British Columbia
Purcell Mountains
Kootenay Land District